Camp Welfare is a historic African-American religious campground located near Monticello, Fairfield County, South Carolina.  It was founded after the American Civil War by the African Methodist Episcopal Zion Church. It is a collection of approximately 100 one-story, frame, weatherboarded cabins called tents arranged in a double "U"-shape.  The focal point of the camp is the arbor; a rough, gable roofed wooden shelter with wooden benches. Also located at the camp is Zion Church; a frame building with a gable roof surmounted by a belfry built about 1930.

It was added to the National Register of Historic Places in 1984.

See also 
 Cattle Creek Campground: United Methodist camp meeting ground in Orangeburg County, South Carolina
 Cypress Camp Ground: Methodist camp meeting ground in Dorchester County, South Carolina
 Indian Fields Campground: Methodist camp meeting ground in Dorchester County, South Carolina
 Mount Carmel Campground: AME Zion camp meeting ground in Lancaster County, South Carolina
 St. Paul Camp Ground: AME camp meeting ground in Dorchester County, South Carolina

References

African-American history of South Carolina
Methodism in South Carolina
Properties of religious function on the National Register of Historic Places in South Carolina
Buildings and structures completed in 1900
Buildings and structures in Fairfield County, South Carolina
National Register of Historic Places in Fairfield County, South Carolina
African Methodist Episcopal Zion Church
Campgrounds in South Carolina
Camp meeting grounds